Anja Antonowicz (born 22 December 1981) is a Polish-German actress from Włocławek.

Career
Antonowicz attended the National Film School in Łódź and obtained an acting diploma in 2004. She initially performed in theatre and television in Poland, appearing in such productions as Bao-Bab, czyli zielono mi and Na dobre i na złe, before moving to Germany to continue her career. She made appearances in Lindenstraße and Bella Block, for which she received a German Television Award nomination for Best Supporting Actress in 2005.

Internationally, Antonowicz has appeared in such films as Nightwatching (2007), The Rainbowmaker (2008), and West (2013).

Selected filmography

References

External links

 

Polish actresses
1981 births
Living people